Rudolf Carnap (18 May 1891 – 14 September 1970) was a German-language philosopher who was active in Europe before 1935 and in the United States thereafter. He was a major member of the Vienna Circle and an advocate of logical positivism. He is considered "one of the giants among twentieth-century philosophers."

Biography

Carnap's father had risen from being a poor ribbon-weaver to be the owner of a ribbon-making factory. His mother came from an academic family; her father was an educational reformer and her oldest brother was the archaeologist Wilhelm Dörpfeld. As a ten-year-old, Carnap accompanied Wilhelm Dörpfeld on an expedition to Greece. Carnap was raised in a profoundly religious Protestant family, but later became an atheist.

He began his formal education at the Barmen Gymnasium and the  Gymnasium in Jena. From 1910 to 1914, he attended the University of Jena, intending to write a thesis in physics. He also intently studied Immanuel Kant's Critique of Pure Reason during a course taught by Bruno Bauch, and was one of very few students to attend Gottlob Frege's courses in mathematical logic.

During his university years he became enthralled with the German Youth Movement.

While Carnap held moral and political opposition to World War I, he felt obligated to serve in the German army. After three years of service, he was given permission to study physics at the University of Berlin, 1917–18, where Albert Einstein was a newly appointed professor. Carnap then attended the University of Jena, where he wrote a thesis defining an axiomatic theory of space and time. The physics department said it was too philosophical, and Bruno Bauch of the philosophy department said it was pure physics. Carnap then wrote another thesis in 1921, under Bauch's supervision, on the theory of space in a more orthodox Kantian style, and published as Der Raum (Space) in a supplemental issue of Kant-Studien (1922).

Frege's course exposed him to Bertrand Russell's work on logic and philosophy, which put a sense of the aims to his studies. He accepted the effort to surpass traditional philosophy with logical innovations that inform the sciences. He wrote a letter to Russell, who responded by copying by hand long passages from his Principia Mathematica for Carnap's benefit, as neither Carnap nor his university could afford a copy of this epochal work. In 1924 and 1925, he attended seminars led by Edmund Husserl, the founder of phenomenology, and continued to write on physics from a logical positivist perspective.

Carnap discovered a kindred spirit when he met Hans Reichenbach at a 1923 conference. Reichenbach introduced Carnap to Moritz Schlick, a professor at the University of Vienna who offered Carnap a position in his department, which Carnap accepted in 1926. Carnap thereupon joined an informal group of Viennese intellectuals that came to be known as the Vienna Circle, directed largely by Schlick and including Hans Hahn, Friedrich Waismann, Otto Neurath, and Herbert Feigl, with occasional visits by Hahn's student Kurt Gödel. When Wittgenstein visited Vienna, Carnap would meet with him. He (with Hahn and Neurath) wrote the 1929 manifesto of the Circle, and (with Hans Reichenbach) initiated the philosophy journal Erkenntnis.

In February 1930 Alfred Tarski lectured in Vienna, and during November 1930 Carnap visited Warsaw. On these occasions he learned much about Tarski's model theoretic method of semantics. Rose Rand, another philosopher in the Vienna Circle, noted, "Carnap's conception of semantics starts from the basis given in Tarski's work but a distinction is made between logical and non-logical constants and between logical and factual truth... At the same time he worked with the concepts of intension and extension and took these two concepts as a basis of a new method of semantics."

In 1931, Carnap was appointed Professor at the German University of Prague. In 1933, W. V. Quine met Carnap in Prague and discussed the latter's work at some length. Thus began the lifelong mutual respect these two men shared, one that survived Quine's eventual forceful disagreements with a number of Carnap's philosophical conclusions.

Carnap, whose socialist and pacifist beliefs put him at risk in Nazi Germany, emigrated to the United States in 1935 and became a naturalized citizen in 1941. Meanwhile, back in Vienna, Schlick was murdered in 1936. From 1936 to 1952, Carnap was a professor of philosophy at the University of Chicago. During the late 1930s, Carnap offered an assistant position in philosophy to Carl Gustav Hempel, who accepted and became one of his most significant intellectual collaborators. Thanks partly to Quine's help, Carnap spent the years 1939–41 at Harvard University, where he was reunited with Tarski. Carnap (1963) later expressed some irritation about his time at Chicago, where he and Charles W. Morris were the only members of the department committed to the primacy of science and logic. (Their Chicago colleagues included Richard McKeon, Charles Hartshorne, and Manley Thompson.) Carnap's years at Chicago were nonetheless very productive ones. He wrote books on semantics (Carnap 1942, 1943, 1956), modal logic, and on the philosophical foundations of probability and inductive logic (Carnap 1950, 1952).

After a stint at the Institute for Advanced Study in Princeton (1952–1954), he joined the UCLA Department of Philosophy in 1954, Hans Reichenbach having died the previous year. He had earlier refused an offer of a similar job at the University of California, Berkeley, because accepting that position required that he sign a loyalty oath, a practice to which he was opposed on principle. While at UCLA, he wrote on scientific knowledge, the analytic–synthetic distinction, and the verification principle. His writings on thermodynamics and on the foundations of probability and inductive logic, were published posthumously as Carnap (1971, 1977, 1980).

Carnap taught himself Esperanto when he was 14 years of age, and remained sympathetic to it (Carnap 1963). He later attended the World Congress of Esperanto in 1908 and 1922, and employed the language while traveling.

Carnap had four children by his first marriage to Elizabeth Schöndube, which ended in divorce in 1929. He married his second wife, Elizabeth Ina Stöger, in 1933. Ina committed suicide in 1964.

Philosophical work 

Below is an examination of the main topics in the evolution of the philosophy of Rudolf Carnap. It is not exhaustive, but it outlines Carnap's main works and contributions to modern epistemology and philosophy of logic.

Der Raum 
From 1919 to 1921, Carnap worked on a doctoral thesis called Der Raum: Ein Beitrag zur Wissenschaftslehre (Space: A Contribution to the Theory of Science, 1922). In this dissertation on the philosophical foundations of geometry, Carnap tried to provide a logical basis for a theory of space and time in physics. Considering that Carnap was interested in pure mathematics, natural sciences and philosophy, his dissertation can be seen as an attempt to build a bridge between the different disciplines that are geometry, physics and philosophy. For Carnap thought that in many instances those disciplines use the same concepts, but with totally different meanings. The main objective of Carnap's dissertation was to show that the inconsistencies between theories concerning space only existed because philosophers, as well as mathematicians and scientists, were talking about different things while using the same “space” word. Hence, Carnap characteristically argued that there had to be three separate notions of space. “Formal” space is space in the sense of mathematics: it is an abstract system of relations. “Intuitive” space is made of certain contents of intuition independent of single experiences. “Physical” space is made of actual spatial facts given in experience. The upshot is that those three kinds of “space” imply three different kinds of knowledge and thus three different kinds of investigations. It is interesting to note that it is in this dissertation that the main themes of Carnap's philosophy appear, most importantly the idea that many philosophical contradictions appear because of a misuse of language, and a stress on the importance of distinguishing formal and material modes of speech.

Der Logische Aufbau der Welt 
From 1922 to 1925, Carnap worked on a book which became one of his major works, namely Der logische Aufbau der Welt (translated as The Logical Structure of the World, 1967), which was accepted in 1926 as his habilitation thesis at the University of Vienna and published as a book in 1928. That achievement has become a landmark in modern epistemology and can be read as a forceful statement of the philosophical thesis of logical positivism. Indeed, the Aufbau suggests that epistemology, based on modern symbolic logic, is concerned with the logical analysis of scientific propositions, while science itself, based on experience, is the only source of knowledge of the external world, i.e. the world outside the realm of human perception. According to Carnap, philosophical propositions are statements about the language of science; they aren't true or false, but merely consist of definitions and conventions about the use of certain concepts. In contrast, scientific propositions are factual statements about the external reality. They are meaningful because they are based on the perceptions of the senses. In other words, the truth or falsity of those propositions can be verified by testing their content with further observations.

In the Aufbau, Carnap wants to display the logical and conceptual structure with which all scientific (factual) statements can be organized. Carnap gives the label "constitution theory" to this epistemic-logical project. It is a constructive undertaking that systematizes scientific knowledge according to the notions of symbolic logic. Accordingly, the purpose of this constitutional system is to identify and discern different classes of scientific concepts and to specify the logical relations that link them. In the Aufbau, concepts are taken to denote objects, relations, properties, classes and states. Carnap argues that all concepts must be ranked over a hierarchy. In that hierarchy, all concepts are organized according to a fundamental arrangement where concepts can be reduced and converted to other basic ones. Carnap explains that a concept can be reduced to another when all sentences containing the first concept can be transformed into sentences containing the other. In other words, every scientific sentence should be translatable into another sentence such that the original terms have the same reference as the translated terms. Most significantly, Carnap argues that the basis of this system is psychological. Its content is the "immediately given", which is made of basic elements, namely perceptual experiences. These basic elements consist of conscious psychological states of a single human subject. In the end, Carnap argues that his constitutional project demonstrates the possibility of defining and uniting all scientific concepts in a single conceptual system on the basis of a few fundamental concepts.

Overcoming metaphysics 
From 1928 to 1934, Carnap published papers (Scheinprobleme in der Philosophie, 1928; translated as Pseudoproblems in Philosophy, 1967) in which he appears overtly skeptical of the aims and methods of metaphysics, i.e. the traditional philosophy that finds its roots in mythical and religious thought. Indeed, he discusses how, in many cases, metaphysics is made of meaningless discussions of pseudo-problems. For Carnap, a pseudo-problem is a philosophical question which, on the surface, handles concepts that refer to our world while, in fact, these concepts do not actually denote real and attested objects. In other words, these pseudo-problems concern statements that do not, in any way, have empirical implications. They do not refer to states of affairs and the things they denote cannot be perceived. Consequently, one of Carnap's main aim has been to redefine the purpose and method of philosophy. According to him, philosophy should not aim at producing any knowledge transcending the knowledge of science. In contrast, by analyzing the language and propositions of science, philosophers should define the logical foundations of scientific knowledge. Using symbolic logic, they should explicate the concepts, methods and justificatory processes that exist in science.

Carnap believed that the difficulty with traditional philosophy lay in the use of concepts that are not useful for science. For Carnap, the scientific legitimacy of these concepts was doubtful, because the sentences containing them do not express facts. Indeed, a logical analysis of those sentences proves that they do not convey the meaning of states of affairs. In other words, theses sentences are meaningless. Carnap explains that to be meaningful, a sentence should be factual. It can be so, for one thing, by being based on experience, i.e. by being formulated with words relating to direct observations. For another, a sentence is factual if one can clearly state what are the observations that could confirm or disconfirm that sentence. After all, Carnap presupposes a specific criterion of meaning, namely the Wittgensteinian principle of verifiability. Indeed, he requires, as a precondition of meaningfulness, that all sentences be verifiable, which implies that a sentence is meaningful only if there is a way to verify if it is true or false. To verify a sentence, one needs to expound the empirical conditions and circumstances that would establish the truth of the sentence. As a result, it is clear for Carnap that metaphysical sentences are meaningless. They include concepts like “god”, “soul” and “the absolute” that transcend experience and cannot be traced back or connected to direct observations. Because those sentences cannot be verified in any way, Carnap suggests that science, as well as philosophy, should neither consider nor contain them.

The logical analysis of language 
At that point in his career, Carnap attempted to develop a full theory of the logical structure of scientific language. This theory, exposed in Logische Syntax der Sprache (1934; translated as The Logical Syntax of Language, 1937) gives the foundations to his idea that scientific language has a specific formal structure and that its signs are governed by the rules of deductive logic. Moreover, the theory of logical syntax expounds a method with which one can talk about a language: it is a formal meta-theory about the pure forms of language. In the end, because Carnap argues that philosophy aims at the logical analysis of the language of science and thus is the logic of science, the theory of the logical syntax can be considered as a definite language and a conceptual framework for philosophy.

The logical syntax of language is a formal theory. It is not concerned with the contextualized meaning or the truth-value of sentences. In contrast, it considers the general structure of a given language and explores the different structural relations that connect the elements of that language. Hence, by explaining the different operations that allow specific transformations within the language, the theory is a systematic exposition of the rules that operate within that language. In fact, the basic function of these rules is to provide the principles to safeguard coherence, to avoid contradictions and to deduce justified conclusions. Carnap sees language as a calculus. This calculus is a systematic arrangement of symbols and relations. The symbols of the language are organized according to the class they belong to and it is through their combination that we can form sentences. The relations are different conditions under which a sentence can be said to follow, or to be the consequence, of another sentence. The definitions included in the calculus state the conditions under which a sentence can be considered of a certain type and how those sentences can be transformed. We can see the logical syntax as a method of formal transformation, i.e. a method for calculating and reasoning with symbols.

It is in the logical syntax that Carnap introduces his notable principle of tolerance. This principle suggests that there is no moral in logic. When it comes to using a language, there is no good or bad, fundamentally true or false. In this perspective, the philosopher's task is not to bring authoritative interdicts prohibiting the use of certain concepts. In contrast, philosophers should seek general agreements over the relevance of certain logical devices. According to Carnap, those agreements are possible only through the detailed presentation of the meaning and use of the expressions of a language. In other words, Carnap believes that every logical language is correct only if this language is supported by exact definitions and not by philosophical presumptions. Carnap embraces a formal conventionalism. That implies that formal languages are constructed and that everyone is free to choose the language it finds more suited to his purpose. There should not be any controversy over which language is the correct language; what matters is agreeing over which language best suits a particular purpose. Carnap explains that the choice of a language should be guided according to the security it provides against logical inconsistency. Furthermore, practical elements like simplicity and fruitfulness in certain tasks influence the choice of a language. Clearly enough, the principle of tolerance was a sophisticated device introduced by Carnap to dismiss any form of dogmatism in philosophy.

Inductive logic 
After having considered problems in semantics, i.e. the theory of the concepts of meaning and truth (Foundations of Logic and Mathematics, 1939; Introduction to Semantics, 1942; Formalization of Logic, 1943), Carnap turned his attention to the subject of probability and inductive logic. His views on that subject are for the most part exposed in Logical foundations of probability (1950) where Carnap aims to give a sound logical interpretation of probability. Carnap thought that according to certain conditions, the concept of probability had to be interpreted as a purely logical concept. In this view, probability is a basic concept anchored in all inductive inferences, whereby the conclusion of every inference that holds without deductive necessity is said be more or less likely to be the case. In fact, Carnap claims that the problem of induction is a matter of finding a precise explanation of the logical relation that holds between a hypothesis and the evidence that supports it. An inductive logic is thus based on the idea that probability is a logical relation between two types of statements: the hypothesis (conclusion) and the premises (evidence). Accordingly, a theory of induction should explain how, by pure logical analysis, we can ascertain that certain evidence establishes a degree of confirmation strong enough to confirm a given hypothesis.

Carnap was convinced that there was a logical as well as an empirical dimension in science. He believed that one had to isolate the experiential elements from the logical elements of a given body of knowledge. Hence, the empirical concept of frequency used in statistics to describe the general features of certain phenomena can be distinguished from the analytical concepts of probability logic that merely describe logical relations between sentences. For Carnap, the statistical and the logical concepts must be investigated separately. Having insisted on this distinction, Carnap defines two concepts of probability. The first one is logical and deals with the degree to which a given hypothesis is confirmed by a piece of evidence. It is the degree of confirmation. The second is empirical, and relates to the long run rate of one observable feature of nature relative to another. It is the relative frequency. Statements belonging to the second concepts are about reality and describe states of affairs. They are empirical and, therefore, must be based on experimental procedures and the observation of relevant facts. On the contrary, statements belonging to the first concept do not say anything about facts. Their meaning can be grasped solely with an analysis of the signs they contain. They are analytical sentences, i.e. true by virtue of their logical meaning. Even though these sentences could refer to states of affairs, their meaning is given by the symbols and relations they contain. In other words, the probability of a conclusion is given by the logical relation it has to the evidence. The evaluation of the degree of confirmation of a hypothesis is thus a problem of meaning analysis.

Clearly, the probability of a statement about relative frequency can be unknown; because it depends on the observation of certain phenomena, one may not possess the information needed to establish the value of that probability. Consequently, the value of that statement can be confirmed only if it is corroborated with facts. In contrast, the probability of a statement about the degree of confirmation could be unknown, in the sense that one may miss the correct logical method to evaluate its exact value. But, such a statement can always receive a certain logical value, given the fact that this value only depends on the meaning of its symbols.

Primary source materials
The Rudolf Carnap Papers contain thousands of letters, notes and drafts, and diaries. The majority of his papers were purchased from his daughter, Hanna Carnap-Thost in 1974, by the University of Pittsburgh, with subsequent further accessions. Documents that contain financial, medical, and personal information are restricted. These were written over his entire life and career. Carnap used the mail regularly to discuss philosophical problems with hundreds of others. The most notable were: Herbert Feigl, Carl Gustav Hempel, Felix Kaufmann, Otto Neurath, and Moritz Schlick. Photographs are also part of the collection and were taken throughout his life. Family pictures and photographs of his peers and colleagues are also stored in the collection. Some of the correspondence is considered notable and consist of his student notes, his seminars with Frege, (describing the Begriffsschrift and the logic in mathematics). Carnap's notes from Russell's seminar in Chicago, and notes he took from discussions with Tarski, Heisenberg, Quine, Hempel, Gödel, and Jeffrey are also part of the University of Pittsburgh Library System's Archives and Special Collections. Digitized contents include:

Notes (old), 1958–1966

More than 1,000 pages of lecture outlines are preserved that cover the courses that Carnap taught in the United States, Prague, and Vienna. Drafts of his published works and unpublished works are part of the collection. Additional Carnap materials can be found throughout the Archives of Scientific Philosophy at the University of Pittsburgh.
Manuscript drafts and typescripts both for his published works and for many unpublished papers and books. A partial listing include his first formulations of his Aufbau.

Much material is written in an older German shorthand, the Stolze-Schrey system. He employed this writing system extensively beginning in his student days. Some of the content has been digitized and is available through the finding aid. The University of California also maintains a collection of Rudolf Carnap Papers. Microfilm copies of his papers are maintained by the Philosophical Archives at the University of Konstanz in Germany.

Selected publications
1922. Der Raum: Ein Beitrag zur Wissenschaftslehre, Kant-Studien, Ergänzungshefte, no. 56 (doctoral thesis).
1926. Physikalische Begriffsbildung. Karlsruhe: Braun.
1928. Scheinprobleme in der Philosophie (Pseudoproblems in Philosophy). Berlin: Weltkreis-Verlag.
1928. Der Logische Aufbau der Welt (his habilitation thesis). Leipzig: Felix Meiner Verlag. English translation by Rolf A. George, 1967. The Logical Structure of the World. Pseudoproblems in Philosophy. University of California Press. 
1929. Abriss der Logistik, mit besonderer Berücksichtigung der Relationstheorie und ihrer Anwendungen. Springer.
1931.  — English translation: 
1934. Logische Syntax der Sprache. English translation 1937, The Logical Syntax of Language. Kegan Paul.
1996 (1935). Philosophy and Logical Syntax. Bristol UK: Thoemmes. Excerpt.
1939, Foundations of Logic and Mathematics in International Encyclopedia of Unified Science, Vol. I, No. 3. University of Chicago Press.
1942. Introduction to Semantics. Harvard Uni. Press.
1943. Formalization of Logic. Harvard Uni. Press.
1945. "On Inductive Logic" in Philosophy of Science, Vol. 12, pp. 72–97.
1945. The Two Concepts of Probability in Philosophy and Phenomenological Research, Vol. 5, No. 4, pp. 513–532.
1947. "On the Application of Inductive Logic" in Philosophy and Phenomenological Research, Vol. 8, pp. 133–148.
1956 (1947). Meaning and Necessity: a Study in Semantics and Modal Logic. University of Chicago Press.
1950. Logical Foundations of Probability. University of Chicago Press. pp. 3–15.
1950. "Empiricism, Semantics, Ontology", Revue Internationale de Philosophie 4: 20–40.
1952. The Continuum of Inductive Methods. University of Chicago Press.
1958. Introduction to Symbolic Logic and its Applications. Dover publications, New York. 
1963, "Intellectual Autobiography" in Schilpp. Paul A. (ed.) The Philosophy of Rudolf Carnap, Library Of Living Philosophers V. XI, Open Court p. 3–83 (1963)  
1966. An Introduction to the Philosophy of Science. Basic Books.
1966. Philosophical Foundations of Physics. Martin Gardner, ed. Basic Books. Online excerpt.
1971. Studies in Inductive Logic and Probability, Vol. 1. University of California Press.
1977. Two Essays on Entropy. Shimony, Abner, ed. University of California Press.
1980. Studies in Inductive Logic and Probability, Vol. 2. Jeffrey, R. C., ed. University of California Press.
2000. Untersuchungen zur Allgemeinen Axiomatik. Edited from unpublished manuscript by T. Bonk and J. Mosterín. Darmstadt: Wissenschaftliche Buchgesellschaft. 167 pp. .

Online bibliography is under construction and has no entries dated later than 1937.

Filmography
 Interview with Rudolf Carnap, German TV, 1964.

See also
 Definitions of philosophy
 Second Conference on the Epistemology of the Exact Sciences
 Second Davos Hochschulkurs

References

Sources

Ivor Grattan-Guinness, 2000. In Search of Mathematical Roots. Princeton Uni. Press.
Thomas Mormann, 2000. Rudolf Carnap. C. H. Beck.
Willard Quine
1951, Two Dogmas of Empiricism. The Philosophical Review 60: 20–43. Reprinted in his 1953 From a Logical Point of View. Harvard University Press.
1985, The Time of My Life: An Autobiography. MIT Press.
Richardson, Alan W., 1998. Carnap's construction of the world : the Aufbau and the emergence of logical empiricism. Cambridge Uni. Press.
Schilpp, P. A., ed., 1963. The Philosophy of Rudolf Carnap. LaSalle IL: Open Court.
Spohn, Wolfgang, ed., 1991. Erkenntnis Orientated: A Centennial Volume for Rudolf Carnap and Hans Reichenbach. Kluwer Academic Publishers.
1991. Logic, Language, and the Structure of Scientific Theories: Proceedings of the Carnap-Reichenbach Centennial, University of Konstanz, May 21–24, 1991. University of Pittsburgh Press.
Wagner, Pierre, ed., 2009. Carnap's Logical Syntax of Language. Palgrave Macmillan.
Wagner, Pierre, ed., 2012. Carnap's Ideal of Explication and Naturalism. Palgrave Macmillan.

Further reading
 Holt, Jim, "Positive Thinking" (review of Karl Sigmund, Exact Thinking in Demented Times: The Vienna Circle and the Epic Quest for the Foundations of Science, Basic Books, 449 pp.), The New York Review of Books, vol. LXIV, no. 20 (21 December 2017), pp. 74–76.
 Psillos, Stathis, "Rudolf Carnap's 'Theoretical Concepts in Science'", Studies in History and Philosophy of Science Part A 31(1) (2000):151–172.

External links

 
 
 
 Rudolf Carnap Webpage and Directory of Internet Resources
 Homepage of the Collected Works of Rudolf Carnap – Department of Philosophy, Carnegie Mellon University
 Precis of Carnap's philosophy
 The Life of Rudolf Carnap, Philosophy at RBJones.com
 R. Carnap: "Von der Erkenntnistheorie zur Wissenschaftslogik", Paris Congress in 1935, Paris, 1936.
 R. Carnap: "Über die Einheitssprache der Wissenschaft", Paris Congress in 1935, Paris, 1936.
 R. Carnap: "Wahrheit und Bewährung", Paris Congress in 1935, Paris, 1936.
 Rudolf Carnap Papers: (Rudolf Carnap Papers, 1905–1970, ASP.1974.01, Special Collections Department, University of Pittsburgh.)
 Das Fremdpsychische bei Rudolf Carnap (German) by Robert Bauer.
 FBI file on Rudolph Carnap 
 
 RUDOLF CARNAP, PHILOSOPHER, DIES obituary in The New York Times, 15 September 1970
Homage to Rudolf Carnap (1970) by Feigl, Hempel, Jeffrey, Quine et al. reprinted in frontmatter of RUDOLF CARNAP, LOGICAL EMPIRICIST (1975)
 [Audio] Carnap lecturing on ‘Theoretical Concepts in Science’ at the meeting of the American Philosophical Association, Pacific Division, at Santa Barbara, California, on 29 December 1959.

1891 births
1970 deaths
20th-century American male writers
20th-century American non-fiction writers
20th-century American philosophers
20th-century atheists
20th-century essayists
20th-century German male writers
20th-century German non-fiction writers
20th-century German philosophers
American atheists
American Esperantists
American logicians
American male essayists
American male non-fiction writers
American people of German descent
American socialists
Analytic philosophers
Atheist philosophers
Corresponding Fellows of the British Academy
Empiricists
Epistemologists
German atheists
German emigrants to the United States
German Esperantists
German essayists
German expatriates in Austria
German logicians
German male non-fiction writers
German philosophers
German socialists
Harvard University people
Institute for Advanced Study visiting scholars
Lecturers
Ontologists
People from the Rhine Province
Philosophers of language
Philosophers of logic
Philosophers of mathematics
Philosophers of science
Philosophers of time
Philosophy academics
Philosophy writers
UCLA Philosophy
University of California, Los Angeles faculty
University of Chicago faculty
University of Jena alumni
University of Vienna alumni
Academic staff of the University of Vienna
Vienna Circle
Writers from Wuppertal